The following radio stations broadcast on AM frequency 890 kHz: WLS in Chicago and KBBI in Homer, Alaska, share Class A status on 890 kHz.  WLS is the only station on that frequency to broadcast with 50,000 watts during nighttime hours. 21 stations in the United States broadcast on 890 kHz. 890 AM is a US clear-channel frequency.

In Argentina
 Libre in Buenos Aires
 LU33 Pampeana in Santa Rosa, La Pampa
 LV11 Santiago del Estero in Santiago del Estero

In Canada
 CJDC in Dawson Creek, British Columbia - 10 kW, transmitter located at

In Cuba
 CMKC: Radio Revolución in Santiago de Cuba
 CMIB (Radio Progreso) in Chambas, Ciego de Avila

In Mexico
  in Acámbaro, Guanajuato

In the United States
Stations in bold are clear-channel stations.

In Uruguay 
 CX 18 in Montevideo

References

Lists of radio stations by frequency